"Chinpokomon" is the eleventh-aired and the tenth-produced episode of the third season of the American animated television series South Park. It originally aired on Comedy Central in the United States on November 3, 1999, making it the 42nd episode of the series. In the episode, the kids become fascinated with the latest fad: a fictional Japanese anime series called Chinpokomon and its related products, such as video games and collectible toys. Chinpokomon is a parody of the popular Pokémon media franchise. "Chinpokomon" was written by South Park co-creator Trey Parker, who also co-directed the episode together with animation director Eric Stough. The episode was nominated for an Emmy Award in 2000.

Plot
The children of South Park become obsessed with an animated Japanese cartoon, Chinpokomon (a parody of Pokémon). The cartoon features overt embedded marketing and subliminal messaging to encourage the purchase and consumption of Chinpokomon-related merchandise. Unbeknownst to the parents, Chinpokomon products all contain anti-American sentiments with the aim of converting American kids to Japanese child soldiers.

Kyle is originally oblivious to the fad, and as its popularity increases he reluctantly attempts to keep up-to-date to avoid ridicule from his friends. Unfortunately, the merchandise lineup is so extensive that he is always one step behind. Meanwhile, the boys make plans to attend the official Chinpokomon camp, which is actually a front for a recruit training boot camp designed by the Japanese government to train and brainwash the kids into becoming soldiers for an upcoming attack on Pearl Harbor. As the adults start to become aware of the scheme, the Japanese distract them by telling them that Americans have "huge penises" compared to the Japanese, a tactic that works well against the male characters.

The parents start to suspect the nonsensical cartoon is dangerous, as "stupidity can be worse than vulgarity and violence" and compare it to Battle of the Network Stars. Sheila Broflofski suggests it is just another harmless fad. This is juxtaposed with the truth of the fad's influence, which has turned the children into brainwashed soldiers and left Kenny in trance-like state after an epileptic seizure caused from playing the Chinpokomon video game.

Becoming increasingly concerned, the parents attempt to defuse the fad's popularity by trying to manufacture new fads: The "Wild Wacky Action Bike", an abnormal plastic glow-in-the-dark bicycle contraption that cannot be steered, and "Alabama Man", an abusive, alcoholic, redneck action figure that comes with a bowling alley playset and a redneck wife to use as a punching bag. The boys, uninterested, call both the bike and action figure "gay".

As the boys march through the town with Emperor Hirohito, President Bill Clinton will not act against the invasion as he too has fallen for the "incredibly large penis" trick. Finally, the parents hit upon the idea of using reverse psychology, pretending to be Chinpokomon fans themselves — figuring that whatever they like their children will immediately dislike. The trick works, and all the children except Kyle instantly lose all interest. Kyle claims that if he stops liking Chinpokomon now, he will be following the crowd, so he prepares to leave in a fighter jet to bomb Pearl Harbor. A heart-felt and contradictory speech by Stan confuses him into reluctantly getting off the jet.

The group decide to avoid fads for a while, and Kenny is discovered to have been dead for some time, as evidenced when his body explodes, unleashing a large number of rats; Cartman is disgusted while Stan and Kyle laugh.

Production
The chinpo or chinpoko element in Chinpokomon is actually a vulgar Japanese word for "penis". According to the DVD commentary, the Japanese man who repeats the "incredibly large penis" trick is based on someone the creators met in Beijing. South Park animator Junichi Nishimura, who Stone met in college, voices the Emperor in this episode. Saki Miata played the Japanese Woman in Live Action Commercial.

Critical reception
DVD Verdict described it as "perhaps the most devastating parody of the seemingly endless pop culture craziness of forced Japan fads", adding: "Beginning with the title and moving through awkward, amateur anime, video games that cause seizures, and parental confusion over what their kids see in the little crappy toys, the episode smacks of too much truth and contains many moments of ultra-high comedy...This particular episode is why South Park is sometimes begrudgingly called genius, even amongst those who consider it a peek inside the Antichrist's subconscious. It proves that, on occasion, Parker can take the envelope, fill it full of outrageous sentiments and blatant stereotyping, mix in a whole lot of social realities, and filter it through his own sense of tasteless humor and end up with yet another brilliant installment of his show."

ElderGeek described the episode as "a very ironic take on children’s trends and how debilitating they can be". Adam Crane of PixelatedPop ranked the episode 23rd in a top 25 greatest episodes list in 2012. ScreenJunkies wrote "The blindness of parents, the zombie-like children following a fad, and the irrational paranoia of Americans who fear the Japanese simply because they make the occasional incomprehensible TV show were all parodied to perfection". IGN said "Chinpokomon was a great rip on the whole Pokemon craze with a lot of crude jokes about Asian male anatomy".

The AV Club noted that this episode was the first instance of the South Park fad episode, in which "Characters briefly latch onto something fleetingly popular and often inherently stupid—which is then obsessed about to the detriment of their relationships (or, occasionally, the safety of the entire town)—then, inevitably, they realize that the object of their obsession is dumb and drop it forever."

References

External links

 "Chinpokomon" Full episode at South Park Studios
 

1999 American television episodes
Anime-influenced Western animation
Television episodes set in Japan
Anti-Japanese sentiment in the United States
Stereotypes of East Asian people
Ethnic humour
Works based on Pokémon
South Park (season 3) episodes
Television episodes about advertising
Japan in non-Japanese culture
Cultural depictions of Hirohito
Cultural depictions of Bill Clinton